Hauströkkrið yfir mér is a 1979 poetry collection by Icelandic poet Snorri Hjartarson. It won the Nordic Council's Literature Prize in 1981.

References

1979 poetry books
Icelandic poetry
Nordic Council's Literature Prize-winning works
Poetry collections
Mál og menning books